Maximilian Welzmüller (born 10 January 1990) is a German professional footballer who plays as a defensive midfielder for German club SpVgg Unterhaching.

Club career

Early career
In his youth, Welzmuller played for SC Fürstenfeldbruck and TSV 1860 Munich before moving to FSV Frankfurt II.

Greuther Furth
In 2010, Welzmuller moved to the youth teams of SpVgg Greuther Fürth. He made his debut on 8 August 2010 against SV Wehen Wiesbaden II. He came on in the 80th minute, replacing Ronny Philp.

Unterhaching
In July 2012, Welzmuller moved to 3. Liga club SpVgg Unterhaching. He made his league debut on 21 July 2012 in a 0–0 draw with SV Darmstadt 98. He scored his first league goal about two months later in a 3–2 win over Arminia Bielefeld on 1 September 2012. The goal came in the 39th minute.

Aalen
On 6 May 2014, he moved to 2. Bundesliga side VfR Aalen signing a two-year contract. He made his league debut for Aalen in a 2–0 loss against SV Sandhausen on 28 February 2015. He was replaced by Andreas Hofmann in the 78th minute. He scored his first league goal for the club a year-and-a-half later with the lone goal in victory over Holstein Kiel. The goal came in the 87th minute.

Return to Unterhaching
On 29 May 2022, Welzmüller agreed to return to SpVgg Unterhaching.

Personal life
His brothers, Lukas and Josef, play for SV Mehring and SpVgg Unterhaching respectively.

Career statistics

Club

References

External links
 
 

1990 births
Living people
Footballers from Munich
Association football midfielders
German footballers
SpVgg Unterhaching players
VfR Aalen players
FC Bayern Munich II players
2. Bundesliga players
3. Liga players
Regionalliga players